The Alternative is a 1978 Australian television film about an unmarried editor of a woman's magazine who finds herself pregnant. She has a relationship with another woman.

Plot
Melanie is an unmarried woman working for a women's magazine. She falls pregnant and decides to raise the baby on her own.

Cast 

 Wendy Hughes as Melanie Hilton
 Peter Adams as Noel Denning
 Carla Hoogeveen as Linda
 Tony Bonner as Peter
 Alwyn Kurts as Doherty
 Ken Goodlet as Melanie's Father
 Betty Lucas as Melanie's Mother
 Anne Haddy as Helen
 Mary Mackie as Mrs. Millbank
 Jackie Rees as June

Production
It was one of a series of TV movies Robert Bruning made for Channel 7. The film was shot in Sydney.

It was the first to air after Is There Anybody There?.

He sold it to Paramount to distribute world wide.

Awards
At the Annual Penguin Awards, given by the Television Society of Australia, the film was awarded best Actress (Wendy Hughes), Actor (Peter Adams) and Supporting Actor (Alwyn Kurts), as well as Best Adult Drama.

References

External links

Clips from the film at YouTube
The Alternative at Screen Australia
The Alternative at BFI
The Alternative at National Film and Sound Archive
The Alternative at AustLit (subscription required)

Australian drama television films
1978 television films
1978 films
1978 drama films
1970s English-language films